Amantis bolivari is a species of praying mantis native to Myanmar and Nepal.

References

bolivarii
Mantodea of Asia
Insects of Myanmar
Insects of Nepal
Insects described in 1915